I Want Your Love may refer to:
 I Want Your Love (film), a 2010 drama short film and 2012 feature-length film
 I Want Your Love (album), an album by Brenda K. Starr
 "I Want Your Love" (Atomic Kitten song)
 "I Want Your Love" (Chic song)
 "I Want Your Love" (Eduard Romanyuta song)
 "I Want Your Love" (Transvision Vamp song)
 "I Want Your Love", a song by Toadies from No Deliverance